Warner is a suburb in the Moreton Bay Region, Queensland, Australia.

Geography 
Warner is approximately 10.6 square kilometres. Warner is located southeast of Lake Samsonvale and west of the urban localities of Strathpine, Brendale, Bray Park and Lawnton.

History 
Warner is named after an early civilian surveyor James Warner.

Warner State School building was completed on Friday 7 April 1876 with delays finding a teacher. It opened in June 1876 with 28 students having enrolled by December 1876. It celebrated its golden jubilee on 25 June 1926. It closed circa 1939. It was on the south-western corner of South Pine Road and Old North Road (now 2 Coorparoo Road).

The predominant style of development in this community is Park Residential, however, new urban developments are occurring in this area. Warner has recently undergone refurbishment from rural land usage to urban.  Prior to this, the predominant use of the land was rural.

Post-2000 establishments in Warner include the Warner Lakes housing estate on 206 hectares of land previously used for potato farming and a quarry, and a retail and commerce estate on the corner of Samsonvale Road and Old North Road. Roads have recently been upgraded in parts of Warner, which now includes seven sets of traffic lights. Further development to the area has led to the inclusion of a McDonald's, Subway, KFC, Warner Chinese Restaurant and The Warner Tavern.

Demographics
The median age of the Warner population was 30 years, 7 years below the national median of 37. 77.1% of people living in Warner were born in Australia. The other top responses for country of birth were New Zealand 4.8%, England 4.6%, South Africa 2.4%, Philippines 1.3%, Fiji 0.9%. 90.6% of people spoke only English at home; the next most common languages were 0.9% Hindi, 0.8% Afrikaans, 0.6% Tagalog, 0.3% Filipino, 0.3% Spanish.

Education
There are no schools in Warner. The nearest government primary schools are Bray Park State School in neighbouring Bray Park to the north-east, Strathpine West State School in neighbouring Strathpine to the east, and Eatons Hill State School in neighbouring Eatons Hill to the south. The nearest government secondary schools are Bray Park State High School in Bray Park and Albany Creek State High School in Albany Creek to the south-east.

Other schools in surrounding suburbs include:

 Strathpine State School (primary), Strathpine
 Holy Spirit Catholic School (primary), Bray Park
 Genesis Christian College (primary and secondary), Bray Park
 Pine Rivers Special School (prmary and secondary), Lawnton
 Pine Rivers State High School (secondary), Strathpine

Amenities 
The Moreton Bay Regional Council operates a mobile library service which visits the Pendicup Community Centre on Samsonvale Road.

There are a number of parks in the area, including:

 Banksia Park
 Frank Nichols Reserve
 Hasen Park
 John H Walker Reserve
 John Hill Park
 Justin Somers Reserve

References

External links

 

Suburbs of Moreton Bay Region